Daniel Fernando Arroyo (born 6 October 1966) is an Argentine political scientist, professor and politician. He was the country's Minister of Social Development, in the cabinet of President Alberto Fernández, from 2019 to 2021. Since 2021, he has been a National Deputy elected in Buenos Aires Province, a position he previously held from 2017 to 2019.

A member of the Justicialist Party affiliated with the Renewal Front, Arroyo served as Minister of Social Development of Buenos Aires Province in the cabinet of Governor Daniel Scioli. In addition, he has taught courses at a number of Argentine universities, including the Torcuato di Tella University, the National University of Cuyo, and the Latin American Faculty of Social Sciences.

Early life and education
Daniel Fernando Arroyo was born on 6 October 1966 in Castelar, Buenos Aires Province. He studied political science at the University of Buenos Aires Faculty of Social Sciences, where he received his licenciatura in 1990; he then went on to receive a post-graduate degree on control and administration of public policy from the Latin American Faculty of Social Sciences (FLACSO) in 1995.

He has taught graduate and post-graduate level courses at FLACSO, at the Torcuato di Tella University, at the National University of Cuyo and at the National University of Moreno, and was a visiting faculty at the University of Bologna in Italy and the University of Salamanca in Spain.

Political career
In 2004 he was appointed as Secretary of Social Policy and Human Development and Deputy Minister of Social Development by President Néstor Kirchner, serving under the administration of Alicia Kirchner until 2007. From then he went on to serve as Minister of Social Development in the Buenos Aires Province provincial cabinet of Governor Daniel Scioli, who reportedly sought him for his technical expertise in the field. As provincial minister he sought to implement the "Plan Más Vida", wherein the government distributed welfare cards to be used in food and other essential goods. He left the position in 2009, and was replaced by Avellaneda mayor Baldomero Álvarez de Olivera.

From 2009 to 2017 he held a number of directive posts in the Banco Provincia, including the directorship from 2016 to 2017. He was also president of the corruption watchdog NGO Poder Ciudadano until 2013, when he stepped down to run for a seat in the Argentine Chamber of Deputies in the Renewal Front list. In 2015 he ran for the position of Vice Governor of Buenos Aires Province in the Renewal Front ticket, alongside Felipe Solá.

In 2017 he ran for a seat in the Chamber of Deputies once again, this time in the 1País list (of which the Renewal Front was part) and was elected; he was sworn in as National Deputy on 10 December 2017.

Minister of Social Development
On 6 December 2019, President-elect Alberto Fernández announced his intention of appointing Arroyo as Minister of Social Development of Argentina, succeeding Carolina Stanley; Arroyo had positioned himself as a staunch opponent of Stanley and the previous administration's welfare and social policies. He assumed office alongside the rest of Fernández's cabinet on 10 December 2019.

Ahead of the 2021 primary elections, Arroyo was confirmed the 12th candidate in the Frente de Todos list to the Chamber of Deputies in Buenos Aires Province. On 9 August 2021, Cabinet Chief Santiago Cafiero confirmed Juan Zabaleta would replace Arroyo as Minister of Social Development. Arroyo's was one of two ministerial replacements ahead of the 2021 election, alongside Agustín Rossi, who was replaced by Jorge Taiana as Minister of Defense.

Personal life
Arroyo is married to Alejandra Folco and has two children, Lucía and Martín.  On 25 September 2020 he confirmed he had tested positive for COVID-19, becoming the first minister of the national cabinet to get infected.

Electoral history

References

External links

Official website of the Ministry of Social Development (in Spanish)

|-

|-

1966 births
Living people
Argentine political scientists
Government ministers of Argentina
People from Morón Partido
Renewal Front politicians
University of Buenos Aires alumni
Academic staff of Torcuato di Tella University
Academic staff of the National University of Cuyo
Academic staff of the University of Bologna
Academic staff of the University of Salamanca
Ministers of social welfare of Argentina
Members of the Argentine Chamber of Deputies elected in Buenos Aires Province